Seamus Moore (born 18 June 1947) is an Irish performer. Moore entered a talent contest and won with his own composition "The JCB Song".  After two years, he was presented with a gold disc by his record company I&B Records to mark over 50,000 sales. He has been known as The JCB Man ever since.  When touring, he is also known as 'Moore the Hurr on Tour'. Moore ran his own public house in Burnt Oak, Middlesex called Conways 3 from 2010 to 2016.

Discography
Moore has released several albums including:

On The Brew
Me Galluses and me Gansy
The Tinker's Potcheen
The Winning Dream
The Pie Bald Ass
Fluthered on the Moon
Cricklewood NW2
Mad To Go Again
A Tough Yoke
Having A Bit Tonite
 Seamus Just Wants To Be Famous'
 The Traveller's DaughterHe also released a 4-track EP entitled The Big Bamboo'' which consists of "The Big Bamboo", "The Fly", "Bang Bang Rosie", and "The Pothole Song".

Other hits include "The Transit Van", "Flash The Lights", "The Cobblefighter", "The Lightning Express", "The Crossroads Of Life", and "The Little Honda 50".

References

External links
 The Official Seamus Moore Website

Living people
1947 births
Irish country singers
Musicians from County Kilkenny